The STAR-2 Bus is a fully redundant, flight-proven, spacecraft bus designed for geosynchronous missions.

It is a satellite platform, designed and developed by Thomas van der Heyden for the Indonesian Cakrawarta satellite program in the early 1990s, now manufactured by Northrop Grumman Innovation Systems with an apogee kick motor to place a communications satellite into geostationary orbit, a thruster to provide the satellite with orbital station-keeping for a 15-year mission, and solar arrays to provide the satellite payload with 5 kW of electrical power.

Advantages 
NGIS's GEOStar-2 bus design is unique within the satellite industry. NGIS's GEOStar-2 bus provides an affordable low-to-medium power satellite platform that is ideal for missions of this size. Rather than being a less efficient version of a larger, heavier product, NGIS's GEOStar-2 bus is designed specifically for the 1000 to 5550 watts payload class.

Design 
The GEOStar-2 bus satellite is a modular, mass efficient structure, designed for simplified integration to reduce manufacturing cycle times. The structure is supported by a composite thrust cylinder, to which the bus, payload, nadir and base panels are connected. Energy from two multi-panel solar wings and lithium-ion batteries is electronically processed to provide 36 volts regulated power to the satellite throughout the mission. All active units aboard the satellite are connected through a 1553 data bus. Commands and telemetry are processed through the flight software resident on the flight processor, which provides robust autonomous control to all GEOStar-2 satellites. The modularity of the structure and the standard 1553 interfaces allow parallel assembly and test of the bus and payload systems, reducing manufacturing schedule risk by minimizing the time spent in serial satellite integration and test flow. GEOStar-2 is designed for missions up to 15 years in duration. The propulsion system is sized for ten years of station keeping in geosynchronous orbit. Built-in radiation hardness for the severe geosynchronous environment is achieved through conservative selection of electronic parts. Several available options augment the basic bus to provide improved pointing, more payload power, secure communications, higher downlink data rates or enhanced payload computing power.

Structure 
 Bus Dimensions (H x W x L): 1.75 x 1.7 x 1.8 m
 Construction: Composite/Al

Power subsystem 
 Payload Power: Up to 5550 watts orbit average at 15 years
 Bus Voltage: 24-36 VDC (nominal)
 Solar Arrays: multi-junction GaAs cells
 Batteries: lithium-ion

Attitude control subsystem 
 Stability Mode: 3-axis; zero momentum
 Propulsion Subsystem 
 Transfer Orbit System: liquid bi-propellant 
 On Orbit: monopropellant (hydrazine)

Command and data handling subsystem 
 Flight Processor: MIL-STD-1750A
 Interface Architecture: MIL-STD 1553B, CCSDS

Payload support 
While primary applications are Fixed-Satellite Services (FSS) and Broadcast Satellite Services (BSS), the GEOStar-2 bus can be adapted for MSS, Earth and space science applications, as well as for technology demonstration or risk reduction programs. Depending on mission duration requirements, the GEOStar-2 bus can accommodate payloads in excess of 500 kilograms, and provide up to 5550 watts of power. Instrument data can be provided in standard format such as CCSDS or through secured encryption, as approved by the National Security Agency (NSA).

Shared launch opportunities 
Due to the size and mass envelope of the satellite, the GEOStar-2 bus is compatible with almost all commercially available launch vehicles, maximizing opportunity for launch and access to space. While dedicated or single launch services are more readily available, the GEOStar-2 bus targets shared launch opportunities, where launch cost and launch-sharing opportunities are favorable.

Mission services 
Customers can purchase the GEOStar-2 bus spacecraft bus alone, or as part of a turn-key service that includes an integrated payload, network operations center and launch vehicle. NGIS conducts spacecraft commissioning from its own ground station prior to transferring spacecraft control to the customer's operations center.

Satellite Orders

See also

 Star Bus
 GEOStar
 Northrop Grumman Innovation Systems

References

Satellite buses
Orbital Sciences Corporation